Rumyana Kaisheva (born 26 December 1955) is a Bulgarian female former volleyball player who competed in the 1980 Summer Olympics.

In 1980 she was part of the Bulgarian team which won the bronze medal in the Olympic tournament. She played all five matches.

References 
 

1955 births
Living people
Bulgarian women's volleyball players
Olympic volleyball players of Bulgaria
Olympic bronze medalists for Bulgaria
Olympic medalists in volleyball
Volleyball players at the 1980 Summer Olympics
Medalists at the 1980 Summer Olympics